The North Central State Trail is a 62-mile (100 km) recreational rail trail serving a section of the northern quarter of the Lower Peninsula of the U.S. state of Michigan.  Following a route generally parallel to Interstate 75, the trail goes northward from the Michigan town of Gaylord to the top of the Lower Peninsula at Mackinaw City and connects to the North Western State Trail.   It serves the towns of Vanderbilt, Indian River, and Cheboygan which connects to the North Eastern State Trail.

History
The North Central State Trail occupies what was once the northernmost segment of the Michigan Central Railroad. This Detroit-based railway, one of the largest and most profitable in the Lower Peninsula, constructed a land-grant section of trackage northward from its primary service area to Mackinaw City in 1882. This spur line served what was then a booming area of old-growth timberland.

The Michigan Central, which was affiliated with the New York Central Railroad, operated passenger trains on this section of railroad from 1882 until the early 1960s, serving tourist locations within Michigan's Northland.  North of Mackinaw City, train passengers and freight transferred onto the railroad car ferries operated by the Mackinac Transportation Company, a joint venture operated by the Michigan Central and two other railroads. On these ferries, railroad service was extended to St. Ignace and onward points on Michigan's Upper Peninsula.

When the Mackinac Bridge was opened in 1957, passengers and freight shifted to automobiles. Trains last operated on a regular basis in the 1980s as a spur line of the Detroit and Mackinac Railway; the right-of-way then ceased to operate as a railroad line and became a trail.  The North Central State Trail's northern end in Mackinaw City is close to the docks once operated by the Mackinac Transportation Company.

The Iron Belle Trail cross-state bike trail uses the North Central State Trail as one of its segments.

Assets
The North Central State Trail borders a substantial section of the shoreline of Michigan's Mullett Lake. It also borders the Cheboygan River.

Access points

References

Protected areas of Cheboygan County, Michigan
Protected areas of Otsego County, Michigan
Rail trails in Michigan
National Recreation Trails in Michigan